Antonio José Estévez Aponte (January 3, 1916 in Calabozo (Guárico) – November 26, 1988 in Caracas), was a Venezuelan musician, composer and conductor.

He founded the Central University of Venezuela's Chorus.

Compositions

His best known work is the Cantata Criolla, released on July 25, 1954, winning the National Music Award and perhaps the most important Venezuelan nationalist work of the 20th century. Other well-known works are Mediodía en el Llano, Cromovibrafonía and Cromovibrafonía multiple that were composed for the exhibition of works of Soto in Montreal and the Museum of Modern Art of Ciudad Bolívar.

Mediodía en el Llano was born in the year 1942. While still a student in the sixth year of composition, Vicente Emilio Sojo commissioned an orchestral suite from him. Estevez responded with his Suite Llanera. It was with this composition that Estévez premiered as conductor in the same year. Originally the suite had three parts: Dawn, Noon and Sunset, taking advantage of the occasion to try to describe in an impressionistic way those three events. Later Estevez removed the outer movements leaving only the central part, which today is the symphonic poem Mediodía in the Llano.

See also
Music of Venezuela
Venezuela Symphony Orchestra

References 
 Antonio Estévez' official site
 Antonio Estévez  – Venezuelatuya.com
 Venezuela Symphony orchestra Magazine, 25th anniversary, 1955.

1916 births
1988 deaths
People from Calabozo
Venezuelan people of Galician descent
Venezuelan people of Spanish descent
Venezuelan classical composers
Venezuelan composers
Male composers
Classical oboists
20th-century classical musicians
20th-century composers
20th-century male musicians